Baptodoris cinnabarina is a species of sea slug or dorid nudibranch, a marine gastropod mollusk in the family Discodorididae. The original description was revised in 1999.

Distribution
This species occurs in the Mediterranean Sea and adjacent coast of the Atlantic Ocean.

Description

Ecology

References

Discodorididae
Gastropods described in 1884